Apoptotic protease activating factor 1, also known as APAF1, is a human homolog of C. elegans CED-4 gene.

Function 

The protein was identified in the laboratory of Xiaodong Wang as an activator of caspase-3 in the presence of cytochromeC and dATP. This gene encodes a cytoplasmic protein that forms one of the central hubs in the apoptosis regulatory network. This protein contains (from the N terminal) a caspase recruitment domain (CARD), an ATPase domain (NB-ARC), few short helical domains and then several copies of the WD40 repeat domain. Upon binding cytochrome c and dATP, this protein forms an oligomeric apoptosome. The apoptosome binds and cleaves Procaspase-9 protein, releasing its mature, activated form.  The precise mechanism for this reaction is still debated though work published by Guy Salvesen suggests that the apoptosome may induce caspase-9 dimerization and subsequent autocatalysis. Activated caspase-9 stimulates the subsequent caspase cascade that commits the cell to apoptosis.

Alternative splicing results in several transcript variants encoding different isoforms.

Structure 

APAF1 contains a CARD domain with a Greek key motif composed of six helices, a Rossman fold nucleotide binding domains, a short helical motif and a winged-helix domain.

Interactions 

APAF1 has been shown to interact with:
 APIP, 
 BCL2-like 1 
 Caspase-9, 
 HSPA4, and
 NLRP1.

References

External links

Further reading 

 
 
 
 
 
 
 
 
 
 
 
 
 
 
 
 
 
 
 

Programmed cell death
Apoptosis